Hillebach  is a small river of North Rhine-Westphalia, Germany. It flows into the Ruhr near Winterberg.

The brook flows - by source-level leaving the Natural Park Sauerland Rothaar - in predominantly north-westerly direction. Then it flows - after right-sided open out the zoom flowing also from Hillekopf welding Micke - Hildfeld, a northern district of Winterberg, near the southern outskirts. Southwest of the village opens a referred to in underflow Grone Springebach who comes from the south towards the town of Grönenbach. Then happened the stream to about 837 m high mountain Clemens, the highest and dominant mountain at cup-shaped river valley, and located on the lower part of its western flank cottages.

Shortly thereafter flows through the Hillebachstausee the lying below the Rimberg (764.5 m) Hillestausee at Niedersfeld, a northern district of Winterberg, a few hundred meters distance downstream - west of the village hall (Schützenhalle) - at about 519 m altitude there coming in from the south Rhein-Ruhr tributary to open.

See also
List of rivers of North Rhine-Westphalia

Rivers of North Rhine-Westphalia
Rivers of Germany